Gymea  is a suburb in southern Sydney, in the state of New South Wales, Australia. Gymea is located 26 kilometres south of the Sydney central business district in the local government area of the Sutherland Shire. The postcode is 2227, which it shares with adjacent suburb Gymea Bay.

History
The Gymea Lily, Doryanthes excelsa is a 6m tall perennial that is prevalent in the area. It was named by the local Dharawal people and became the inspiration for the suburb's name, by government surveyor W.A.B. Geaves in 1855. The Gymea Lily has been adopted as a symbol of the area and features on the crest of many local organisations. Development in the area has eradicated most of the lilies but many can still be found, a few kilometres south, in the Royal National Park.

By the 1920s, steam trams operated between Cronulla and Sutherland, via Gymea. The railway station on the line to Cronulla opened in 1939.

Population
In the 2016 Census, there were 7,589 people in Gymea. 75.7% of people were born in Australia. The next most common countries of birth were England 4.2%, China 1.6% and New Zealand 1.6%. 83.1% of people spoke only English at home. Other languages spoken at home included Mandarin 1.6%, Greek 1.5% and Cantonese 1.3%. The most common responses for religion in were Catholic 29.5%, No Religion 25.5% and Anglican 21.1%.

Commercial area
Gymea is primarily a low density, residential suburb. Located close to Gymea railway station, the suburb's shopping strip is known as Gymea Shopping Village. Over the last decade it has become a popular shopping and 'café culture' district with many cafés, restaurants, boutiques and gourmet food shops opened along Gymea Bay Road. The Gymea Hotel is also located on Gymea Bay Road. It was opened in 1959 and was originally called the Gymea Rex Hotel.

Transport
Gymea railway station is on the Cronulla branch of the Illawarra railway line, part of the Sydney Trains network, which provides regular rail services to the city. Gymea railway station is on Gymea Bay Road, in the middle of the main shopping area. Adjacent stations are Kirrawee and Miranda. Private buses, principally operated by Transdev NSW also service the local area and provide school student transport.

Education
The suburb has one public primary school, Gymea North Public School; a Catholic primary school, St Catherine Labouré Primary; a secondary school, Gymea Technology High School; and the Sydney Montessori School for pre-primary, primary and secondary students. Many children in Gymea attend schools in Gymea Bay, especially Gymea Bay Public School(the largest primary school in the Sutherland Shire), and Kirrawee. Gymea is also home to a campus of the Sydney Institute of TAFE.

Churches
 St Paul's and St Barnabas Anglican Church 
 St Catherine Labouré Catholic Church
 St Stylianos Greek Orthodox Church (officially known as St Stylianos, Saints Peter and Paul, St Gregory of Palamas) 
 Gymea Baptist Church 
 Gymea People's Church

Culture

Art
Gymea is home to the Hazelhurst Regional Gallery and Arts Centre, which features art galleries, art studios, a theatrette, gardens, meeting rooms, gallery shop and cafe. A number of special events are held at the gallery throughout the year.

Sport
Like many suburbs in the Sutherland Shire, Gymea maintains an active culture of youth sport and has well-established cricket, rugby league, swimming (Gymea Bay Amateur Swimming Club), football (Gymea United FC, which is currently the largest club in the Oceania region), and netball clubs.

Pop culture
Australian writer Scot McPhie named his collection of poetry published in 1999 'Gymea', after living near the suburb in the 1990s. 2SSR broadcasts from Gymea TAFE.

Events
 The Gymea Village Fair is held every year in the last Sunday in October. The streets are closed for stalls, arts and crafts, rides and music.

Plant Nursery
The Sutherland Shire Council's Plant Nursery, with local plants propagated by Bushcare volunteers, is in Gymea.  Plants are available for revegetation and landscaping.

References

Suburbs of Sydney
Sutherland Shire